Saint Barbara with a Donor or Saint Barbara with a Devotee is a 1558 oil on canvas painting by Lattanzio Gambara, originally painted for an altar dedicated to saint Barbara in the church of Santi Nazaro e Celso in Brescia but now on the right-hand side-altar in Santa Maria in Silva church in the same city.

Bibliography
Francesco De Leonardis, Il patrimonio artistico della chiesa di Santa Maria in Silva in AA.VV., Santa Maria in Silva, Delfo, Brescia 2003

Paintings in Brescia
Italian paintings
Paintings of Saint Barbara
1558 paintings